Nanna griseata is a moth of the subfamily Arctiinae. It was described by Lars Kühne in 2007. It is found in Ivory Coast.

References

 

Endemic fauna of Ivory Coast
Lithosiini
Moths described in 2007